Nako may refer to:

People 
Rudin Nako (born 1987), Albanian footballer

Given name
Nako (Obotrite prince) (fl. 954–c. 966), Obotrite leader
 (born 1972), Japanese Paralympic archer
 (born 1993), Japanese actress
 (born 1993), Japanese women's basketball player
Nako Spiru (1918–1947), Albanian politician
Nako Yabuki (born 2001), Japanese singer and actress

Characters 
Nako Sonoda, a character in the manga Cat Street
Nako Oshimizu, a character in the anime/manga Hanasaku Iroha
Nadeshiko Yaeno, a character in the visual novel Nanatsuiro Drops
Nako Kagura, a character in the manga Steel Angel Kurumi 2

Places 
Nako Department, Burkina Faso
Nakofunakata Station, a railway station in Tateyama, Chiba Prefecture, Japan
Nako, Himachal Pradesh, a village in the Himalayas of northern India
Nako Island, an island in Greenland
Nako Lake, a high altitude lake in Pooh, Kinnaur, India

See also
Charalabos Nakos (born 1988), Greek footballer

Japanese feminine given names